Deep Brook is a community in the Canadian province of Nova Scotia, located in  Annapolis County. It is situated on the south shore of the Annapolis Basin and is on Nova Scotia Trunk 1.

References

Communities in Annapolis County, Nova Scotia